KBYI (94.3 MHz) is a public FM radio station in Rexburg, Idaho. It is one of two terrestrial radio stations owned by Brigham Young University-Idaho, which is an arm of the Church of Jesus Christ of Latter-day Saints (LDS). It has a radio format of classical music along with news and information from National Public Radio (NPR).  The main signal covers Eastern Idaho, with rebroadcasting stations around Idaho, Wyoming and Montana.

KBYI has an effective radiated power (ERP) of 100,000 watts, the maximum for FM stations.  The transmitter is in Menan near the Snake River.

Programming
Promoted as "The Music You Want, The News You Need", KBYI broadcasts classical music programming, along with Morning Edition, All Things Considered, and a limited number of LDS-focused religious programming. Local news is planned and produced by BYU-Idaho students.  Some 20 students work for BYU-Idaho Radio each semester. Sister station 91.5 KBYR-FM maintains a religious format.

History 

KRIC signed on at then-Ricks College in September 1972. It was a 10-watt station on 90.1 MHz. In May 1984, KRIC moved to 100.5 MHz and increased its power to 75,000 watts.

In 2011, KBYI moved to 94.3 MHz. The move was part of a multi-state, multi-station series of changes in frequency assignments, which included three swaps in Rexburg and Idaho Falls. The 94.3 frequency was vacated by KSNA, which moved to 99.1; the 99.1 license of KUPI-FM moved to 100.7; and KBYI moved to 94.3.

Translators 
KBYI maintains an extensive translator network with many dependent translators in Idaho, Montana and Wyoming.

K266AU is owned by Ted W. Austin.

References

External links
 

BYI
Brigham Young University–Idaho
Classical music radio stations in the United States
NPR member stations
Radio stations established in 1960
1960 establishments in Idaho